The 2007 Men's EuroHockey Nations Challenge I was the 2nd edition of the EuroHockey Nations Challenge I, the third level of the European field hockey championships organized by the European Hockey Federation. It was held from 9 to 15 September 2007 in Kazan, Russia.

The tournament also served as a qualifier for the 2009 Men's EuroHockey Nations Trophy, with the top two teams, Russia and Belarus, qualifying.

Qualified teams
The following six teams, shown with pre-tournament world rankings, competed in the tournament.

Results
''All times are local (UTC+2).

Preliminary round

Pool A

Final standings

 Promoted to the EuroHockey Nations Trophy

References

EuroHockey Championship III
International field hockey competitions hosted by Russia
Men 3
EuroHockey Championship III Men
EuroHockey Championship III Men
Sport in Kazan
21st century in Kazan